Tsuzurao Dam is a concrete gravity dam located in Nara prefecture in Japan. The dam is used for power production. The catchment area of the dam is 120.4 km2. The dam impounds about 15  ha of land when full and can store 1137 thousand cubic meters of water. The construction of the dam was started in1936 and completed in 1937.

References

Dams in Nara Prefecture
1937 establishments in Japan